Shea Bradley Arender (born 7 November 1980) is an American Symphony Producer Entrepreneur, Broadway producer, and is the CEO/owner of the Las Vegas Symphony Orchestra. Though he is primarily a Symphony Producer, he is also a vocalist, music Arranger, and songwriter. Since July 2013, he has been executive producing Harold Arlen's Broadway Estate musical "The Wonderful Wizard of Song"  around the world and throughout the U.S., and has been executive producing and starring in his own off-broadway musical "Shea: Prince of Christmas".

Early life and education 
Arender was born in Tallulah, Louisiana. He grew up in Mississippi as well as the greater New Orleans area, to the sounds of gospel, pop-rock, soul and Dixieland Jazz,  to which he credits his varied musical influences. His mother, LaShara, is an independent clothing designer who also worked in the Skin Care industry; his father, Billy Arender, worked in agriculture. His musical roots mirror his mixed ancestry of Irish, Cajun/French, and Italian. At age 12, Arender won an on-ship talent contest while his family was on a cruise aboard the Commodore Cruise Line. Two days later, he was chosen to play Elvis Presley to entertain passengers when the original Elvis tribute fell ill. He also had many poems published that he had written as a member of the Georgia Poetry Society. In 2005, he was featured as one of the top new poets by the Poem Hunter Publication  honoring new poets on the rise.

Arender was educated at Georgia State University in Atlanta,  and attended American Inter-Continental University at both the Atlanta and Miami campuses, at which he studied international business.  He graduated there in 2004, with a BS in International Business. Throughout college, he performed musically on various local stages.

Career
In 2000, at age 20, Arender briefly performed at the Imperial Palace in Biloxi,  Mississippi, for the popular "Legends in Concert".  Soon after, he toured with his Elvis tribute show across the south, in Brazil and in Italy.  While in Grado, Italy, at age 22, he studied Opera and Italian Music studies at Scuola Insieme.  The next year, he signed with the Tropicana Entertainment in Laughlin, Nevada,  and performed for six months at many of their U.S. entertainment properties. For the remainder of his 20s, he continued to perform in various venues throughout the US.

In 2007, Arender released a solo tribute album entitled "American Trilogy", that was only made available at his live shows. In 2010, Arender co-wrote with Steve Blaze, from the legendary hard rock group Lillian Axe an original Christmas song entitled "The Christmas I Met You",  released on New Orleans-based Mandeville Records. 
"The Christmas I Met You" reached 6 on the Billboard Singles Christmas Charts  and rose to 1 on the Cash Box Easy Listening Charts. The Merry Christmas Network honored it by adding it to its "Top 100 All Time Christmas Songs".  In 2011, Arender performed over a 100 shows, called "The Great American Songbook Experience", at Branson, Missouri's Hall of Fame Theatre
 
In 2012, Arender returned to Las Vegas, where he was approached by friend and performer George Bugatti on behalf of the estate of music composer Harold Arlen managed by his son, Sam Arlen, known for writing the songs of "The Wizard of Oz" and other American standards, such as Frank Sinatra's "One for My baby", "Somewhere Over the Rainbow", and I've Got the World on a String" , which Sam Arlen had heard him sing online. Following this contact, the Harold Arlen Estate/Yellow Brick Productions hired Arender to perform for their musical "The Wonderful Wizard of Song".  Thereafter, Arender became Executive Producer of the show, taking it to New York City, where it became a hit Broadway musical.

While in New York City, Arender created, produced and starred in an original off-Broadway musical at St. Luke's Theatre, entitled "Shea: Prince of Christmas", a Christmas love story which received favorable critical and fan reviews. Arender also performed a concert version of his Christmas Broadway musical for the National Arts Center, in association with the estate of pop artist Andy Warhol and Warhol's Public Relations firm, Jeffrey Richards & Associates, headed by R. Couri Hay.

In 2014, Arender executive produced "The Wonderful Wizard of Song" musical at the Smith Center in Las Vegas  and represented Yellow Brick Productions for the 75th Anniversary of the musical soundtrack of the "Wizard of Oz" at the 2014 Tony Awards in New York City.

New project
Shea's latest project is working to hone his original musical style with 7x Grammy-winning Producer/Mixer/Arranger/Writer Steve Thompson  and noted Producer/Performer Damon Elliott, the son of Dionne Warwick.

Discography
2007: American Trilogy
2012: Every Day's Christmas
2013: Every Day's Christmas (Broadway Gold Edition)
2013: Concert Journey (Live)

Awards
Shea Arender was given an International of Peace Award by Spumda International and the United Nations for his charitable efforts for children around the world. The award was presented to him in Manila, Philippines by global ambassadors.

References

External links
 Official website

Living people
1980 births
Singer-songwriters from Louisiana
21st-century American singers